Perpetual is an Australian investment fund and trustee group in the S&P/ASX 200. The company provides investment products, financial advice, philanthropic and corporate services to individuals, families, financial advisers and organisations.

History

Perpetual was conceived in 1885 by a committee of business professionals with the purpose of forming a trustee company. The committee included Edmund Barton, Australia's 1st Prime Minister, managing director John Street of the Street family and chairman James Fairfax of the Fairfax family.

The Perpetual Trustee Company (Limited) was officially formed in 1886, originally based at 105 Pitt Street Sydney. John Pewtress, an accountant, became the first employee. In 1888, a special act was granted to Perpetual (the power) to act as a corporate executor and trustee by the NSW Legislative Assembly. An increasing number of prominent citizens appointed Perpetual as executor or trustee of their estates – in many cases for generations.

Perpetual continued to develop a strong and secure reputation throughout the First World War and The Great Depression. At that time, Perpetual Trustee Company controlled trust estates to the value of £50,000,000, making it easily Australia’s largest trustee company. In 1935 all staff were required to sign an ‘Obligation of Secrecy’ book, a practice that continued until 1988.

In 1963, The Perpetual Executors & Trustees Association of Australia Ltd (Victoria) and Queensland Trustees Ltd, which had operated in their own states since the 1880s, merged with Perpetual Trustee Company Ltd (NSW). In 1964 Perpetual listed its shares on the Australian Securities Exchange and this continues today.

During the 1980s, 1990s and 2000s (decade), Perpetual expanded beyond its traditional trustee business into the rapidly developing funds management industry. This included superannuation, financial advice, and corporate trustee and securitisation services.

In 2020, Perpetual expanded globally by acquiring two specialist asset management firms; Barrow Hanley Global Investors, a leader in global value investing, and Trillium Asset Management, an industry pioneer in environmental, social and governance (ESG) investing and shareholder advocacy.

In April 2022 Perpetual launched a takeover offer for Pendal Group. Pendal Group's shareholders accepted the offer in December 2022 with the transaction to take effect in 2023.

Philanthropy
Trustee services were initially provided in the late 19th century when prosperous Australians began creating charitable endowments. Today, Perpetual is Australia’s largest manager of philanthropic funds, including acting as trustee for over 450 charitable trusts.

Logo
The Möbius strip is a key element of Perpetual's brand, signifying strength and continuity.

See also

Perpetual Trustee Company Building

References

External links
 Perpetual Main Site

Financial services companies based in Sydney
Companies listed on the Australian Securities Exchange
Financial services companies established in 1886
1886 establishments in Australia